Ana Jotta is a Portuguese artist born in 1946  in Lisbon.

Early life 
Ana Jotta studied art at ESBAL – Escola de Belas Artes de Lisboa (Lisbon)  and at La Cambre in Brussels. From 1976 to 1979 Jotta was an actress and a decorator for cinema and theatre. She became more focused on visual arts since the 1980s.

Career 
Jotta explores all artistic fields: painting, sculpture, installation, sound, photography. She also works with craft techniques like sewing, embroidery and pottery. Her projects are extremely varied, she invents new and unexpected forms for each of her exhibitions. In 2018, she co-curated with Ricardo Valentim "from A to C", an exhibition of works by Al Cartio and Constance Ruth Howes at Gulbenkian Museum, Lisbon. 

Jotta has had two major career retrospectives: "Rua Ana Jotta" at Museu Serralves (Porto, 2005) and "A Conclusão da Precedente" at Culturgest (Lisboa, 2014).

References

External links 

 Ana Jotta works at the Gulbenkian Museum

Living people
20th-century Portuguese women artists
21st-century Portuguese women artists
People from Lisbon
1946 births
Portuguese contemporary artists